In 1971, Jiří Raška became the first Czechoslovakian to win the Four Hills Tournament. For the first time, an athlete who won three out of four events did not end up winning the tournament after Ingolf Mork lost twenty points to Raška and Hubac in Innsbruck.

For the first time in four years, Raška did not actually win any event in the tournament. It was a desolate year for the two host nations: No athlete from Germany or Austria placed in the Top 15 at any event.

Participating nations and athletes

The national groups of Germany and Austria only competed at the two events in their respective countries.

Results

Oberstdorf
 Schattenbergschanze, Oberstdorf
30 December 1970

Garmisch-Partenkirchen
 Große Olympiaschanze, Garmisch-Partenkirchen
1 January 1971

Innsbruck
 Bergiselschanze, Innsbruck
3 January 1971

Bischofshofen
 Paul-Ausserleitner-Schanze, Bischofshofen
6 January 1971

Final ranking

References

External links
 FIS website
 Four Hills Tournament web site

Four Hills Tournament
1970 in ski jumping
1971 in ski jumping